Lucie Petit-Diagre (24 July 1901 – 24 December 2001) was a Belgian athlete. She competed in the women's discus throw at the 1928 Summer Olympics.

References

1901 births
2001 deaths
Belgian centenarians
Athletes (track and field) at the 1928 Summer Olympics
Belgian female discus throwers
Olympic athletes of Belgium